Lannemezan is a railway station in Lannemezan, Occitanie, France. The station is on the Toulouse–Bayonne railway line and the former Lannemezan–Arreau railway line. The station is served by Intercités (long distance) and TER (local) services operated by the SNCF.

Train services
The following services currently call at Lannemezan:
intercity services (Intercités) Hendaye–Bayonne–Pau–Tarbes–Toulouse
local service (TER Occitanie) Toulouse–Saint-Gaudens–Tarbes–Pau

References

External links

Railway stations in Hautes-Pyrénées
Railway stations in France opened in 1867